This is a list of medalists at the Rhythmic Gymnastics Junior European Championships, organized by the European Union of Gymnastics since 1987.

1980s
1987
Athens, Greece

1989
Tenerife, Spain

1990s
1991
Lisbon, Portugal

1993
Bucharest, Romania

1994
Thessalonika, Greece

1995
Prague, Czech Republic

1996
Asker, Norway

1997
Patras, Greece

1999
Budapest, Hungary

2000s
2001
Geneva, Switzerland

2003
Riesa, Germany

2005
Moscow, Russia

2006
Moscow, Russia

2007
Baku, Azerbaijan

2008
Torino, Italy

2009
Baku, Azerbaijan

2010s
2010
Bremen, Germany

2011
Minsk, Belarus

2012
Nizhny Novgorod, Russia

2013
Vienna, Austria

2014
Baku, Azerbaijan

2015
Minsk, Belarus

2016
Holon, Israel

2017
Budapest, Hungary

2018
Guadajalara, Spain

2019
Baku, Azerbaijan

2020s
2020
Kiev, Ukraine

2021
Varna, Bulgaria

References 

Rhythmic Gymnastics Junior European Championships
Lists of medalists in gymnastics